Francisco Cornejo (b. La Paz, Baja California Sur, 1892 – d. 1963) was a Mexican painter and sculptor, specialized in Maya and Aztec themes. He was influenced by Pre-Columbian art.

Biography 
Cornejo studied in Mexico City until 1911, and then he moved to Los Angeles, where he taught San Franciscan teachers in ancient American art. He exhibited in Mexico City, at Stanford University, at the California School of Fine Arts, and in Los Angeles. One of his most famous works are the interiors and façade decoration in the Mayan Theater in Los Angeles, a theater built in 1927 under architect Stiles O. Clements, designed in the art deco mode known as Mayan Revival architecture.

In the 1930s, he returned to his home country, where he lived and worked until his death.

References

External links 
 Façade of the Mayan theater, Los Angeles

Mexican genre painters
1892 births
1963 deaths
Artists from Baja California
People from La Paz, Baja California Sur
20th-century Mexican painters
Mexican male painters
20th-century Mexican sculptors
20th-century Mexican male artists